List of Sabrina the Teenage Witch characters may refer to:

 List of Sabrina the Teenage Witch (comics) characters
 List of Sabrina the Teenage Witch (1996 TV series) characters
 List of Sabrina the Teenage Witch (1970 TV series) characters
 List of Chilling Adventures of Sabrina (TV series) characters